British rock band Smokie released 21 studio albums and 26+ singles between 1975 and 2010.

Studio albums

Live albums

Compilation albums

Singles

Notes

References

Rock music discographies